Iran da Conceição Gonçalves Júnior (born 10 October 1995), commonly known as Iran Junior, is a Brazilian footballer who currently plays as a attacking midfielder for Kosovan club Ulpiana.

References

External links

1995 births
Living people
Brazilian footballers
Brazilian expatriate footballers
Association football midfielders
Besa Kavajë players
Kategoria e Parë players
KF Teuta Durrës players
Kategoria Superiore players
Brazilian expatriate sportspeople in Albania
Expatriate footballers in Albania
Footballers from São Paulo